Nerelimomab is a mouse monoclonal antibody acting as a TNF inhibitor.

References

Monoclonal antibodies